Hog badgers are three species of mustelid in the genus Arctonyx. They represent one of the two genera in the subfamily Melinae, alongside the true badgers (genus Meles).

Taxonomy 
Arctonyx was formerly considered a monotypic genus containing one species, A. collaris, but a 2008 study found it to comprise 3 distinct species, a finding later followed by the American Society of Mammalogists.

Species 
Three species are known:

Conservation 
The IUCN considers the greater hog badger (A. collaris), the northern hog badger (A. albogularis) and the Sumatran hog badger (A. hoevenii) as three separate species. The greater hog badger is listed as a Vulnerable species. The other two are listed as Least Concern.

References 

Badgers